The State Prison at Søbysøgård is an open prison in Denmark, which is arranged at the Hall of Søby Søgård close to Årslev.

The manor house was being used as a youth prison in 1933 but has been changed to an open prison in 1973. In 2003 The State Prison at Søbysøgård also got a half open section at the prison. The prison has a space for 134 inmates, of whom 26 are in the semi-open section.

Prison places great emphasis on education of the inmates – It is possible to take preparatory adult education and adult education in the prison.

External reference
The State Prison at Søbysøgård - The Danish Prison and Probation Service website

Sobysogard
1933 establishments in Denmark